Springfield City School District is the public school district that serves the city of Springfield, Ohio. It operates 14 schools: ten elementary, three middle, and one high. The district is led by superintendent Robert Hill.

Schools

Elementary schools
Fulton Elementary School
Horace Mann Elementary School
Kenton Elementary School
Kenwood Elementary School
Lagonda Elementary School
Lincoln Elementary School
Perrin Woods Elementary School
Snowhill Elementary School
Snyder Park Elementary School
Warder Park/Wayne Elementary School

Middle schools
Hayward Middle School
Roosevelt Middle School
Schaefer Middle School

High school
Springfield High School

Alternative schools
Keifer Alternative School

Former schools
Franklin Middle School, closed 2004
North High School, closed 2008
South High School, closed 2008
Clark Middle School (Springfield, Ohio), closed 2009

References

External links

Springfield, Ohio
School districts in Ohio
Education in Clark County, Ohio